Bauhinia flagelliflora is a species of legume in the family Fabaceae. It is found only in Ecuador. Its natural habitat is subtropical or tropical moist montane forests.

References

flagelliflora
Endemic flora of Ecuador
Endangered flora of South America
Taxonomy articles created by Polbot